45th New York Film Critics Circle Awards
February 1, 1980

Best Picture:
Kramer vs. Kramer

The 45th New York Film Critics Circle Awards honored the best filmmaking of 1979. The winners were announced on 19 December 1979 and the awards were given on 1 February 1980.

Winners
Best Actor:
Dustin Hoffman - Kramer vs. Kramer
Runners-up: Peter Sellers - Being There and Nick Nolte - North Dallas Forty
Best Actress:
Sally Field - Norma Rae
Runners-up: Bette Midler - The Rose and Hanna Schygulla - The Marriage of Maria Braun
Best Director:
Woody Allen - Manhattan
Runners-up: Robert Benton - Kramer vs. Kramer and Bob Fosse - All That Jazz
Best Film:
Kramer vs. Kramer
Runners-up: Breaking Away and Manhattan
Best Foreign Language Film:
The Tree of Wooden Clogs (L'albero degli zoccoli) • Italy
Runners-up: La Cage aux Folles • France/Italy, Peppermint Soda (Diabolo menthe) • France and Soldier of Orange (Soldaat van Oranje) • Netherlands/Belgium
Best Screenplay:
Steve Tesich - Breaking Away
Runners-up: Woody Allen and Marshall Brickman - Manhattan and Jerzy Kosinski - Being There
Best Supporting Actor:
Melvyn Douglas - Being There
Runners-up: Frederic Forrest - The Rose and James Woods - The Onion Field
Best Supporting Actress:
Meryl Streep - Kramer vs. Kramer and The Seduction of Joe Tynan
Runners-up: Jane Alexander - Kramer vs. Kramer and Barbara Barrie - Breaking Away

References

External links
1979 Awards

1979
New York Film Critics Circle Awards, 1979
New York Film Critics Circle Awards
New York
New York Film Critics Circle Awards
New York Film Critics Circle Awards